Alberto Bonucci (19 May 1918 – 5 April 1969) was an Italian film actor and director. He appeared in 53 films between 1950 and 1967. He was born in Campobasso, Italy and died in Rome, Italy.

Partial filmography

 Variety Lights (1950) - Night Club Comic
 Fugitive in Trieste (1951)
 Toto in Color (1952) - Il regista russo
 It Happened in the Park (1953) - Il presentatore del concorso di bellezza (segment: Concorso di bellezza)
 Neapolitan Carousel (1954) - Lyricist #1
 The Contessa's Secret (1954) - Castiglione
 La moglie è uguale per tutti (1955) - Leopoldo Rossi
 Les Hussards (1955) - Raphaël
 The Best Part (1955) - Antoine
 Lo svitato (1956) - Un vigile urbano
 Susanna tutta panna (1957) - Massimo
 Femmine tre volte (1957) - Santucci
 Ladro lui, ladra lei (1958) - Dottor Valletti
 Promesse di marinaio (1958) - Giulio
 Il terrore dell'Oklahoma (1959) - Benny
 Roulotte e roulette (1959) - Alberto
 Il Mattatore (1960) - Gloria Patri
 Le signore (1960) - (uncredited)
 Blood and Roses (1960) - Carlo Ruggieri
 Un mandarino per Teo (1960) - Il notaio
 Gli incensurati (1961) - Il regista
 The Last Judgment (1961) - Guest of Matteoni
 Scandali al mare (1961) - Dante
 Le magnifiche 7 (1961) - Il professor Valdo
 Walter e i suoi cugini (1961) - Sisini
 Pugni, pupe e marinai (1961) - Dott. Milanò
 I tromboni di Fra Diavolo (1962) - Tenente Bergere
 I motorizzati (1962)
 Twist, lolite e vitelloni (1962) - Giovanni
 La donna degli altri è sempre più bella (1963) - The Acting Teacher (segment "I Promessi Sposi")
 Obiettivo ragazze (1963) - Il sottufficiale della ronda (uncredited)
 Le monachine (1963) - Mr. Batistucchi
 The Swindlers (1963) - President of Roma Football Club (segment "Società calcistica, La")
 Siamo tutti pomicioni (1963) - The Sicilian Husband with cigarette (segment "Pomicioni di provincia")
 The Four Musketeers (1963) - Cyrano de Bergerac
 Love in Four Dimensions (1964) - Pallotta, il produttore (segment "Amore e arte")
 Cleopazza (1964)
 Le sette vipere (Il marito latino) (1964) - Lawyer of Lorenzo
 Oltraggio al pudore (1964)
 Sedotti e bidonati (1964) - Arturo
 A Monster and a Half (1964) - Prof. Carogni
 Letti sbagliati (1965) - Lo zio de Enrichetta (segment "Quel porco di Maurizio")
 I figli del leopardo (1965) - Babalone
 Seven Golden Men (1965) - Radio Ham
 La vedovella (1965) - Assessore Caputo
 Questo pazzo, pazzo mondo della canzone (1965)
 Mondo pazzo... gente matta! (1966) - Anchise Spadoni
 Seven Golden Men Strike Again (1966) - Radio Ham (uncredited)
 The Mona Lisa Has Been Stolen (1966) - L'illusioniste
 7 monaci d'oro (1966) - Podista
 The Taming of the Shrew (1967) - Nathaniel
 Crónica de nueve meses (1967) - Enrique

References

External links

1918 births
1969 deaths
Italian male film actors
Italian film directors
People from Campobasso
Accademia Nazionale di Arte Drammatica Silvio D'Amico alumni
20th-century Italian male actors